A solar canal is a canal fitted with solar panels, increasing their efficiency, and reducing evaporation and land usage. The first operative system was installed in Gujarat, India in 2014.

Benefits 
By placing solar panels above water, evaporation is lessened. Studies from the Canal Solar Power Project in India, show that the resulting shade helps reduce weeds, as well as de-weeding costs. The photovoltaic panels benefit from evaporative cooling. The panels remain cooler, thus reflecting less light and thereby absorbing more energy.  Because solar collectors are often built on arable land or natural ecosystems, solar canals could reduce land lost to energy production, as well as conflicts with farmers and other stakeholders.  Furthermore, land acquisition costs and land-use permitting issues may be circumscribed, if canals are already in operation. Irrigation systems may benefit, given that pumps would be located within easy access of a power source.

History 
A large project in Gujarat, India was completed in 2014. That project utilizes pre-existing irrigation canals, thereby saving land and water, while generating electricity.  The project's success led to the initiation of many other solar canals in India.   The state of Gujarat has plans to build 19,000 kilometers of solar canals.

The first phase of a large project in Lebanon called the “Beirut River Solar Snake” began in 2013 and was completed in 2015. The project aimed to create solar power in a city where land costs are prohibitively high. 

The state of California is moving ahead with plans to build large scale solar canals. The initial project is set to be completed in 2023.

Former Secretary General of the United Nations, Ban Ki-Moon visited Gujarat's solar canals and declared that they should be adopted globally.

Challenges 
Solar canals are more costly to install than land-based solar collectors. They also incur higher maintenance costs. Canals that are quite narrow or quite wide can add to the costs of solar canals.

References 

Solar power
Irrigation canals